Jerónimo Bautista Lanuza (3 January 1533 – 15 December 1624) was a Spanish Dominican friar, bishop and writer. He was bishop of Barbastro and Albarracin.

He wrote many works, usually in the form of homilies: Treaties evangelicals; Homilies in three folio volumes; Memorial against the Jesuits and Homily on Solemnity of the Blessed Sacrament.

Spanish male writers
1533 births
1624 deaths
University of Salamanca alumni